Eric Delabar is a retired American soccer goalkeeper who played professionally in the Major Indoor Soccer League. He is the head coach of the Maryville University women's soccer team.

Player

Youth
Delabar grew up playing for St. Louis Kutis and graduated from De Smet Jesuit High School. He attended Quincy University, playing on the men's soccer team from 1976 to 1979.  In 1977, 1977 and 1979, Quincy won the NAIA national men's soccer championship.  Delabar was a 1978 NAIA First Team All American. He graduated with a bachelor's degree in history.  In 1989, Quincy inducted Delabar into the school's Hall of Fame.  In 2008, he was inducted into the NAIA Hall of Fame.

Professional
From 1979 to 1984, Delabar played for the St. Louis Steamers of the Major Indoor Soccer League.

Coach
In 1989, Delabar became the head coach of the Fort Zumwalt North High School boys' soccer team, a position he held until 1998.  He also served as an assistant coach at Washington University in St. Louis and Saint Louis University. In 1999, Maryville University hired Delabar as the women's soccer coach.  In 2002, he also took on the role of men's team head coach. He compiled a 33-73-6 record with the men's team over six seasons.

He currently works at Fort Zumwalt School District's South Middle School as a Physical Education teacher.

In 2011, the St. Louis Soccer Hall of Fame inducted Delabar.

External links
 MISL stats
 Maryville Saints: Eric Delabar

References

Living people
1956 births
Soccer players from St. Louis
American soccer coaches
American soccer players
Quincy Hawks men's soccer players
Major Indoor Soccer League (1978–1992) players
St. Louis Steamers (original MISL) players
St. Louis Kutis players
Association football goalkeepers
Washington University Bears coaches